New Berrima is a village in the Southern Highlands of New South Wales, Australia, in Wingecarribee Shire. 

At the 2021 census, there were 598 residents.

A cement factory was established in new Berrima, New South Wales in the late 1920s. New Berrima was built for its workers about 3 km south-east of Berrima during this time.

Notes and references

Towns of the Southern Highlands (New South Wales)
Wingecarribee Shire